Rudolf Fischer may refer to:

 Rudi Fischer (1912–1976), Swiss racing driver
 Rudolf Fischer (musician) (1913–2003), German musician
 Rudolf Fischer (writer) (1901–1957), German writer
 Rudolf Fischer (historian) (1923–2016), Romanian historian

See also
 Rudolph Fisher (1897–1934), American physician, radiologist, novelist, short story writer, dramatist, musician, and orator